The Tian Shan wapiti or Tian Shan maral (Cervus canadensis songaricus), is a subspecies of C. canadensis.  It is also called the Tian Shan elk in North American English.

Description
It is  native to the Tian Shan Mountains in eastern Kyrgyzstan, southeastern Kazakhstan, and North Central Xinjiang of western China. It is the largest subspecies of Asian wapiti, both in body size and antlers.

Conservation
Around 50,000 individual Tian Shan elk are left in the wild, and they are declining at a rapid rate. China has about 4000 to 5000 individuals in deer farms.

See also
Altai wapiti
Red deer

References 

Elk and red deer
Mammals of Central Asia
Mammals of China
Biota of Xinjiang
Tian Shan